Oleksiy Boryslavskiy (born 17 November 1968) is a Ukrainian swimmer. He competed in the men's 4 × 100 metre freestyle relay at the 1988 Summer Olympics representing the Soviet Union.

References

External links
 

1968 births
Living people
Ukrainian male swimmers
Olympic swimmers of the Soviet Union
Swimmers at the 1988 Summer Olympics
People from Zuhres
Ukrainian male freestyle swimmers
Soviet male swimmers
Sportspeople from Donetsk Oblast